Wilfred Henry Haines (June 1882 – after 1908) was an English professional footballer who played in the Football League for Stoke and Birmingham.

Career
Haines was born in Stone, Staffordshire and played amateur football with Mount Pleasant Alliance and Newcastle Swifts before joining Stoke in 1904. He played three matches for Stoke in 1904–05 scoring once which came on this final day of the season against Small Heath before returning to non-league football in the Staffordshire area. Birmingham paid Stafford Rangers £250 for his services in July 1908, expecting him to improve their chances of immediate promotion back to the First Division. He played only twice before the arrival of outside right Jack Wilcox pushed him even further down the pecking order, and he was released back to Staffordshire football at the end of the season.

Career statistics
Source:

References

1882 births
Year of death missing
People from Stone, Staffordshire
English footballers
Association football wingers
Stoke City F.C. players
Stafford Rangers F.C. players
Birmingham City F.C. players
English Football League players
Date of birth missing
Place of death missing